Acer morrisonense is an Asian species of maple found only in the mixed forests of eastern and southern Taiwan, at elevations of 1800 – 2200 m. The species is sometimes confused with another Taiwanese tree, Acer caudatifolium.

Description
Acer morrisonense is a tree growing to 20 m tall, with a smooth, yellowish-grey bark. The branchlets are glabrous, bearing deciduous leaves with petioles 5–7 cm non-compound, the leaf blade suborbicular-ovate, 8-10 × 6-8  cm, papery, adaxially glabrous, 5-veined at the base which is nearly truncate or subcordate, the margin doubly serrate with coarse acute teeth, shallowly 5-lobed, to 1/5 width of blade. The distinctive middle lobe is shortly ovate, the apex acuminate. The flowers are racemose, 15 in number, and appear during March and April in Taiwan.  The fruits are small, yellowish-brown, and ripen in October.

References

External links

Plants described in 1911
morrisonense
Endemic flora of Taiwan
Trees of Taiwan
Taxa named by Bunzō Hayata